MS  Shota Rustaveli was a cruise ship, built in 1968 by V.E.B. Mathias-Thesen Werft, Wismar, East Germany for the Soviet Union's Black Sea Shipping Company and named after the Georgian poet Shota Rustaveli. After the fall of the Soviet Union she was handed to Ukraine. In 2000, she was sold to Kaalbye Group and renamed MS Assedo. In 2003, she was scrapped at Alang, India.

References

 

Cruise ships
Ships built in East Germany
Passenger ships of the Soviet Union
East Germany–Soviet Union relations
Ships of Ukraine
1966 ships
Ships built in Wismar
Ships of Black Sea Shipping Company